Thomas FitzGerald, 5th Earl of Desmond (c. 1386–1420), was the only son of John FitzGerald, 4th Earl of Desmond. Upon John's death in 1399, Thomas succeeded to the earldom of Desmond, which lay in Munster, in the southwest of Ireland.

In 1418, Thomas was dispossessed of his lands and deprived of his earldom by his paternal uncle, James FitzGerald, 6th Earl of Desmond, after Thomas had concluded a marriage far below his station to Catherine MacCormac of Abbeyfeale; Catherine was the daughter of one of Thomas's dependants, William MacCormac, known as "the Monk of Feale." A marriage between a man of Norman blood and a woman of Gaelic ancestry was in violation of the Statutes of Kilkenny.

This ill-fated romance was the subject of the air "Desmond's Song" by the Irish poet Thomas Moore.

After the loss of his earldom, Thomas withdrew to France, where he "died at Rouen, 10th August 1420, and was buried at Paris 'with great and mighty show, where the two kings of England and France were present'".

Marriage and issue
Thomas FitzGerald and Catherine MacCormac (a.k.a. Katherine McCormick) of Abbyfeale had two sons:
 Maurice, ancestor of the FitzGeralds of Adare and Broghill,
 John Claragh, who died in 1452.

Notes

Thomas
14th-century Irish people
15th-century Irish people
Normans in Ireland
1386 births
1420 deaths
Earls of Desmond (1329 creation)